The women's discus throw event at the 2014 Asian Games was held at the Incheon Asiad Main Stadium, Incheon, South Korea on 29 September.

Schedule
All times are Korea Standard Time (UTC+09:00)

Records

Results

References

Results

Discus throw
2014 women